The 2011–12 Montpellier HSC season was the 38th professional season of the club since its creation in 1974. 

In that season, the club was won its first Ligue 1 title, finishing the season with 82 points, three points ahead of runners-up Paris Saint-Germain. On 20 May 2012, in a game marred by stoppages for crowd violence, John Utaka scored a brace to secure a 2–1 victory over Auxerre and win the Ligue 1 title for Montpellier. Olivier Giroud, who finished the season with 21 goals and 9 assists, was the league's top goal scorer. Despite being tied on goals with Paris Saint-Germain attacker Nenê, he was named the league's top scorer by the Ligue de Football Professionnel due to finishing with more goals in open play.

Players

French teams are limited to four players without EU citizenship. Hence, the squad list includes only the principal nationality of each player; several non-European players on the squad have dual citizenship with an EU country. Also, players from the ACP countries—countries in Africa, the Caribbean, and the Pacific that are signatories to the Cotonou Agreement—are not counted against non-EU quotas due to the Kolpak ruling.

Current squad

As of August 4, 2011.

Out on loan

Transfers

Summer in

Summer out

Winter out

Competitions

Ligue 1

League table

Results summary

Results by round

Matches

Coupe de France

Coupe de la Ligue

References

Montpellier HSC seasons
Montpellier
French football championship-winning seasons